The FIBA Africa Championship 1997 was hosted by Senegal from July 25 to August 3, 1997.  The games were played in Dakar.  The top two countries in this FIBA Africa Championship earned the two berths allocated to Africa for the 1998 FIBA World Championship in Greece. Senegal won the tournament, the country's 5th African championship and first since 1980, by beating Nigeria 69-48 in the final.  Both teams qualified for the 1998 FIBA World Championship.

Teams
The following national teams competed:

Preliminary rounds

Group A

Day 1

Day 2

Day 3

Day 4

Day 5

Group B

Day 1

Day 2

Day 3

Knockout stage

Classification Stage

Final standings

Senegal and Nigeria qualified for the 1998 FIBA World Championship in Athens.

Awards

See also
 1996 FIBA Africa Clubs Champions Cup

External links
 FIBA Archive

B
1997 in African basketball
B
AfroBasket
July 1997 sports events in Africa
August 1997 sports events in Africa